Disraeli Gears is the second studio album by the British rock band Cream. It was released in November 1967 and reached No. 5 on the UK Albums Chart., and No. 1 on the Swedish and Finnish charts.  The album was also No. 1 for two weeks on the Australian album chart and was listed as the No. 1 album of 1968 by Cash Box in the year-end album chart in the United States.  The album features the singles "Strange Brew" and "Sunshine of Your Love", as well as their respective B-sides "Tales of Brave Ulysses" and "SWLABR".

The original 11-track album was remastered in 1998, and then subsequently released as a two-disc Deluxe Edition in 2004.

Production

The album was recorded at Atlantic Studios in New York between 11 and 15 May 1967, following the band's nine shows as part of Murray the K's "Music in the 5th Dimension" concert series. Cream's American label, ATCO, was a wholly owned subsidiary of Atlantic Records.

The sessions were produced by future Mountain bassist Felix Pappalardi – who co-wrote the tracks "Strange Brew" and "World of Pain" with wife Gail Collins – and were engineered by Tom Dowd – who would later work with Clapton on projects such as Layla and Other Assorted Love Songs and 461 Ocean Boulevard. Atlantic Records owner Ahmet Ertegun was also present during the sessions.

According to Dowd the recording sessions took only three-and-a-half days. The band's visas expired on the very last day of recording.

Drummer Ginger Baker recalled how the album's title was based on a malapropism which alluded to 19th-century British Prime Minister Benjamin Disraeli:

Artwork

The cover art was created by Australian artist Martin Sharp who lived in the same building as Clapton, The Pheasantry in Chelsea. Sharp would go on to create the artwork to Cream's next album Wheels of Fire and co-wrote the songs "Tales of Brave Ulysses" and The Savage Seven movie theme "Anyone for Tennis" with Clapton. The photography was by Bob Whitaker, known for his work for the Beatles, including the controversial Yesterday and Today "butcher" cover. Most of the photographs were taken in July 1967, with shoots in London's Hyde Park as well as in the Scottish Highlands. Some of the images were shot on Ben Nevis, the tallest mountain in the British isles. The photos show a clean-shaven Clapton with a bouffant, permed hairstyle. By the time of the album's release in November, however, he was letting his hair grow out straight and had grown a moustache.

The front cover consists of a psychedelic collage with the title centred and band name below, surrounded by a floral arrangement. Martin Sharp was attempting to capture the sound of the music in the cover, which he describes as a "warm fluorescent sound":

The cover art was later used for the compilation Those Were the Days.

Musical style

Disraeli Gears features the group veering away, quite heavily, from their blues roots and indulging in more psychedelic sounds, in particular on tracks such as "Tales of Brave Ulysses", "SWLABR", "World of Pain" and "Dance the Night Away", the last of which features a 12-string guitar (the only time the instrument would be used on a Cream recording). The most blues-like tunes on the album are Clapton's arrangement of "Outside Woman Blues", the Bruce-Brown composition "Take It Back" which had been inspired by the contemporary media images of American students burning their draft cards which featured harmonica work by Jack Bruce, and the opening track "Strange Brew", which was based on a 12-bar blues song called "Lawdy Mama" and features an Albert King guitar solo, copied note for note.

Unlike the previous Fresh Cream, which was vocally dominated by Bruce, the vocals on Disraeli Gears were a more democratic affair. Clapton sings lead on "Strange Brew" and "Outside Woman Blues", and co-lead on "World of Pain", "Dance the Night Away" and "Sunshine of Your Love". Baker, meanwhile, performs lead vocals on his composition "Blue Condition". All three band members sing together on "Mother's Lament".

In contrast to much of the band's other work, Disraeli Gears comprises mainly short, self-contained songs, with none of the improvisation and jamming for which the band was known onstage.

Release

The album was released in November 1967 by Reaction Records.

Deluxe Edition

The original 11-track album was remastered by Joseph M. Palmaccio at PolyGram Studios for a 1998 release, including bonus photographs accompanying the original album artwork.

The Disraeli Gears Deluxe Edition includes the complete album in both mono and stereo, demos, alternative takes and tracks taken from the band's live sessions on BBC radio. Included is an outtake of "Blue Condition" with Eric Clapton on lead vocals, and demos of the songs "Weird of Hermiston" and "The Clearout" which were not released until Jack Bruce's first solo album Songs for a Tailor.

Reception

Writing for the BBC, Chris Jones described the album as "a perfect encapsulation of the point where the blues got psychedelic and in turn got heavy". Thomas Erlewine of AllMusic describes the album as "a quintessential heavy rock album of the '60s". Dave Swanson of Ultimate Classic Rock believes the album to be "their masterpiece".

In 1999, the album was inducted into the Grammy Hall of Fame.

It was voted number 182 in the third edition of Colin Larkin's All Time Top 1000 Albums (2000). In 2003 the album was ranked number 112 on Rolling Stone magazine's list of the 500 Greatest Albums of All Time, then was re-ranked at number 114 in a 2012 revised list, and at number 170 in a 2020 revised list. VH1 named it 87th-greatest album of all time in 2001. In 2008, the album won a Classic Rock Roll of Honours Award for Classic Album.

Track listing

Original album

Disraeli Gears – deluxe edition (2004)
{|
|-
| valign=top |

Disc one (stereo)
Original album
Tracks 1–11
Out-takes
 "Lawdy Mama" – version 1  (Traditional, arr. Clapton) – 2:00
Recorded 3 April 1967 at Atlantic Studios
Recorded by Ahmet Ertegun
 "Blue Condition" – alternate version (Baker) – 3:13
Eric Clapton vocal, previously unreleased
Demos 
 "We're Going Wrong" (Bruce) – 3:49
 "Hey Now, Princess" (Bruce, Brown) – 3:31
 "SWLABR" (Bruce, Brown) – 4:30
 "Weird of Hermiston" (Bruce, Brown) – 3:12
 "The Clearout" (Bruce, Brown) – 3:58
Recorded 15 March 1967 at Ryemuse Studios, London
| valign=bottom |

Disc two (mono)
Original album and out-takes
Tracks 1–13
BBC recordings 
"Strange Brew" (Clapton, Pappalardi, Collins) – 3:00
 "Tales of Brave Ulysses" (Clapton, Sharp) – 2:55
 "We're Going Wrong" (Bruce) – 3:25
Recorded 30 May 1967, broadcast 3 June on BBC Light Programme
 "Born Under a Bad Sign" (Booker T. Jones, William Bell) – 3:03
 "Outside Woman Blues" (Reynolds) – 3:18
 "Take It Back" (Bruce, Brown) – 2:17
Recorded 24 October 1967, broadcast 29 October on BBC Radio 1
 "Politician" (Bruce, Brown) – 3:59
 "SWLABR" (Bruce, Brown) – 2:32
 "Steppin' Out" (James Bracken) – 3:37
Recorded 9 January 1968, broadcast 14 January on BBC Radio 1
|}
Tracks previously released on the Those Were the Days box set.
Tracks previously released on the BBC Sessions compilation album.

Personnel
Cream
Ginger Baker – drums, percussion, vocals
Jack Bruce – bass, piano, vocals, harmonica
Eric Clapton – lead guitar, rhythm guitar, 12-string guitar, vocals

Production
Felix Pappalardi – producer
Tom Dowd – recording engineer
Bob Whitaker – cover photography
Martin Sharp – cover art
Jim Marshall – additional photography

Chart positions

Weekly charts

Year-end charts

Certifications

Release history

See also 
 Album era

Notes

References

Sources
Cream, Disraeli Gears (1967)
Cream, Disraeli Gears – Deluxe Edition (2004)

External links
Disraeli Gears. Those Were the Days.
Disraeli Gears. JackBruce.com.
Disraeli Gears – Deluxe Edition JackBruce.com.
Disraeli Gears – GB Signed Edition Gingerbaker.com.

Cream (band) albums
1967 albums
Grammy Hall of Fame Award recipients
Albums produced by Felix Pappalardi
Reaction Records albums
Atco Records albums
Polydor Records albums
RSO Records albums